Natronobacillus   is a Gram-positive, moderately halophilic, alkalitolerant, aerobic, spore-forming and motile genus of bacteria from the family of Bacillaceae with one known species (Natronobacillus azotifigens).
Natronobacillus azotifigens has been isolated from soil from Siberia.

References

Bacillaceae
Bacteria genera
Monotypic bacteria genera